The 1994 West Coast Conference men's basketball tournament took place on March 5–7, 1994. All rounds were held in Santa Clara, California at the Toso Pavilion.

The  won the WCC Tournament title and an automatic bid to the 1994 NCAA tournament. Dana Jones of Pepperdine was named Tournament MVP.

Format
With eight teams participating, all eight teams were placed into the first round, with teams seeded and paired based on regular-season records. After the first round, teams were re-seeded so the highest-remaining team was paired with the lowest-remaining time in one semifinal with the other two teams slotted into the other semifinal.

Bracket

References

1993–94 West Coast Conference men's basketball season
West Coast Conference men's basketball tournament
West Coast Athletic Conference men's basketball tournament
West Coast Athletic Conference men's basketball tournament